Manuel Santos Arboleda Sánchez (born August 2, 1979) is a retired Colombian football defender.

Achievements 
 Recopa Sudamericana 2004 Champion with Cienciano
 Polish Cup runner up 2006 with Zagłębie Lubin
 Polish Championship in 2006/2007 season with Zagłębie Lubin
 Polish Championship in 2009/2010 season with Lech Poznań

External links
 Manuel Arboleda profile on www.90minut.pl
 Article informing about Arboleda being interested in playing for Poland

1979 births
Living people
Colombian footballers
Colombian expatriate footballers
People from Buenaventura, Valle del Cauca
Association football defenders
Independiente Santa Fe footballers
Deportes Tolima footballers
Atlético Huila footballers
Cienciano footballers
Expatriate footballers in Peru
Zagłębie Lubin players
Lech Poznań players
Expatriate footballers in Poland
Categoría Primera A players
Ekstraklasa players
Colombian expatriate sportspeople in Poland
Polish footballers
Sportspeople from Valle del Cauca Department